Guatteria ramiflora is a species of plant in the Annonaceae family. It is endemic to Peru.

References

ramiflora
Flora of Peru
Vulnerable plants
Taxonomy articles created by Polbot